Enugu State Peoples Democratic Party, also known as Enugu PDP, is the largest contemporary political party in Enugu State, Nigeria. It is affiliated with the national Peoples Democratic Party, and is led by chairman Augustine Nnamani. The party has its headquarters in Enugu, which is the state capital. As of May 2015, the party had controlled the Enugu State governorship for 16 years.

Current leadership
Chairman: Augustine Nnamani
Secretary: Mr. Cletus Akalusi
Organizing Secretary: Dr. Christian Iyiani 
Woman Leader: Mrs. Vera Ezugwu
Youth leader: Hon Patty Okoh

Current elected officials

List of party chairmen
Charles Egumgbe
Onyioha Nwanjoku
Vita Abba
Ikeje Asogwa (2014—2016)
Augustine Nnamani (2016—present)

See also
Delta State Peoples Democratic Party

References

Enugu
Peoples Democratic Party (Nigeria) by state